Abarema acreana is a tree species in the legume family (Fabaceae). It is a rather mysterious plant and may be endemic to Brazil. Fruiting trees apparently have never been found, and thus it is not clear whether this plant belongs into the genus Abarema, or in Hydrochorea, or elsewhere.

Footnotes

References
  (2005): Abarema acreana. Version 10.01, November 2005. Retrieved 2008-MAR-31.
 

acreana
Trees of Brazil
Flora of Brazil
Data deficient plants
Taxonomy articles created by Polbot
Taxobox binomials not recognized by IUCN